100 Greatest African Americans is a biographical dictionary of one hundred historically great Black Americans (in alphabetical order; that is, they are not ranked), as assessed by Temple University professor Molefi Kete Asante in 2002. A similar book was written by Columbus Salley. First published in 1992,  Salley's book is titled The Black 100: A Ranking of the Most Influential African-Americans, Past and Present.

Criteria
Asante used five factors in establishing the list:
 "significance in the general progress of African-Americans toward full equality in the American social and political system"
 "self-sacrifice and a willingness to take great risks for the collective good"
 "unusual will and determination in the face of great danger and against the most stubborn odds"
 "a consistent posture toward raising the social, cultural and economic status of African Americans"
 "personal achievement that reveals the best qualities of the African American people"

Reference and User Services Quarterly reviewed the list positively in 2003, while noting the subjectivity in judging greatness, particularly for contemporary individuals. A review in Booklist that same year states that Asante "makes it very clear that he left out numerous current popular people because he feels the hype around the pop persona is not what makes an individual important ... Each portrait covers two to four pages that summarize the person’s life, work, and importance and is accompanied by a black-and-white photograph or illustration."

List

(This is the list as published in the 2002 book)

See also
 Lists of African Americans

References

2002 non-fiction books
Books about African-American history
Lists of African-American people
Prometheus Books books
African American
African American
21st-century encyclopedias
Black elite